Acanthosaura lepidogaster, commonly known as the brown pricklenape, is a species of agamid lizard found in Thailand, Vietnam, Myanmar, Laos and China.

References

External links
 Photo of Acanthosaura lepidogaster in Khao Yai National Park, Thailand

Acanthosaura
Reptiles of Vietnam
Reptiles of Myanmar
Reptiles of Thailand
Reptiles of Laos
Reptiles of China
Reptiles described in 1829
Taxa named by Georges Cuvier